Aviaport is the name of several rural localities in the Sakha Republic, Russia:
Aviaport, Kobyaysky District, Sakha Republic, a selo under the administrative jurisdiction of the Settlement of Sangar in Kobyaysky District
Aviaport, Olyokminsky District, Sakha Republic, a selo under the administrative jurisdiction of the Town of Olyokminsk in Olyokminsky District

See also
Aeroport (disambiguation)